London 0 Hull 4 is the debut album by The Housemartins, released in June 1986. It contains the singles "Flag Day" (#124 UK), "Sheep" (#54 UK), "Happy Hour" (#3 UK) and "Think for a Minute" (#18 UK).

The title refers to the band's home city of Kingston upon Hull and is in the format of a football score.  It also refers to Paul Heaton's assertion that the Housemartins were only the fourth best band in Hull.  In other words, Hull had four great bands, compared to none from London. The other three Hull bands in question were Red Guitars, Everything but the Girl and The Gargoyles.  The title 'London 0 Hull 4' was used by various newspapers as a headline in October 2008 after the city's newly promoted football team, Hull City, beat West Ham United to take a fourth win out of four against London-based clubs (having previously beaten Fulham, Arsenal and Tottenham Hotspur).

The liner notes and lyrics reflect singer Paul Heaton's interest at that time in Christianity and Marxism. For example, the back cover of the album contains the message, "Take Jesus – Take Marx – Take Hope".

The CD release of the album featured four additional tracks along with the front cover phrase, "16 songs – 17 hits!".

The album was re-released on 22 June 2009, as London 0 Hull 4 Deluxe, containing a second CD of bonus tracks, B-sides and live recordings.

Track listing
All songs written by Paul Heaton and Stan Cullimore, except for where noted.

Original release (1986)

"Happy Hour"
"Get Up Off Our Knees" (Paul Heaton, Stan Cullimore, Ted Key)
"Flag Day" (Paul Heaton, Stan Cullimore, Ted Key)
"Anxious"
"Reverends Revenge" (instrumental)
"Sitting on a Fence"
"Sheep"
"Over There"
"Think for a Minute"
"We're Not Deep"
"Lean on Me" (Paul Heaton, Pete Wingfield)
"Freedom" (Paul Heaton, Stan Cullimore, Ted Key)

CD version adds "I'll Be Your Shelter (Just Like a Shelter)", "People Get Ready", "The Mighty Ship" and "He Ain't Heavy, He's My Brother" to the end of the tracklist.

Deluxe Edition Bonus CD (2009)

"Flag Day" [single version]
"Stand at Ease "
 "You"
 "Coal Train to Hatfield Main"
 "I'll Be Your Shelter (Just Like A Shelter)"
 "People Get Ready" [B-side]
 "Drop Down Dead"
 "The Mighty Ship"
 "He Ain't Heavy He's My Brother"
 "Think for a Minute" [single version]
 "Who Needs the Limelight" [B-side]
 "I Smell Winter"
 "Joy Joy Joy"
 "Rap Around the Clock"
 "Lean on Me" [previously unreleased/outtake rehearsal]
 "Anxious" [BBC Janice Long session 6/11/85]
 "We're Not Deep" [BBC Janice Long session 6/11/85]
 "Freedom" [BBC Janice Long session 6/11/85]
 "Think for a Minute" [BBC Saturday Live session 4/1/1986]
 "Drop Down Dead" [BBC Saturday Live session 4/1/1986]
 "Happy Hour" [BBC John Peel session 6/4/1986]
 "Get Up Off Our Knees" [BBC John Peel session 6/4/1986]

Charts

Personnel

The Housemartins
Norman Cook – bass, vocals
Hugh Whitaker – drums, vocals
P.d. Heaton – lead vocals, guitar, harmonica, melodica
Stan Cullimore – guitar, vocals
with:
Pete Wingfield - piano on "Flag Day", "Anxious" and "Lean On Me"

Design
 David Storey – album cover design

References

The Housemartins albums
1986 debut albums
Go! Discs albums